Catherine "Kasha" Rigby (born 1970) is a competitive skier who calls Utah home. She is most noted for her many achievements and first descents as "the pioneer of extreme telemark skiing."

Early life
Kasha has skied since she could walk and began telemark skiing as a teenager. Her passion for skiing and traveling has been the driving force behind most of her adult life. She began traveling at age 19, leaving college to explore Africa. She then headed to Colorado, where she became involved in telemark racing and extreme-skiing competitions.

Kasha joined The North Face Ski Team in 1995 and has since brought her skis all over the U.S., Canada, South America, New Zealand, Russia, Asia, Europe, India and even the Middle East, skiing first descents of some of the world's most revered peaks, including the Five Holy Peaks in Mongolia.

Outside magazine credited her as being: "the best female telemark skier in the known universe", when she appeared on the cover of Women Outside in Fall 1998

Career highlights
 Climb and ski descent of Choy Oyu 26,907 ft (8201m) (credited as the first telemark descent)
 Mongolia Women's Ski Expedition: first ski descents of the Five Holy Peaks in Tavan Bogd (including Kuitan, the highest peak in Mongolia) 
 Mt. Waddington Ski Expedition: descent of Mt. Waddington and Combatant Couloir, British Columbia
 Yukon Territories to Dry Bay, Alaska, ski exploration, accessed from the Tatshenshini River
 Hanuman Tibba Women’s Expedition: first ski descent of RFHP, a 2500m couloir in the Himachal Pradesh region of India
 Kamchatka Women's Ski Expedition: First ski descent of Mt. Udina & Mt. Zimina, as well as the first female ski descent of Mt. Tolbachik (all telemarked)
 Lebanon Ski Expedition: ski descent of Qornet as-Sawda, 3090m, traverse of the Mt. Lebanon Range
 Mt. Belukha: ski exploration and descent of the highest peaks in Siberia (photos)
 Cotopaxi (5897m) and Chimborazo (6310m) Volcanoes of Ecuador: ski descent of world’s highest active volcano
 Multiple First Descents along Gibb's Fjord, Baffin Island
 Ski and kite Greenland
 21 peaks in 21 days Bolivia 
 Trek of Frozen Zanskar River – Ladahk, India

Films/Videos
 1997 Scott Gaffney's Breathe
 1999 Higher on the Mountain 
 2001 Warren Miller's Cold Fusion
 2001 Transworld Television: Ski Nomads: A Traverse of Lebanon 
 2001 OLN Adventure Series Mystery Mountain
 2004 Incognito: Total Telemark 4 
 2006 Shelter from the Storm
 2009 Edge of Never 
 2015 Ultimate Survival Alaska, Season 3

References

External links

 Personal Website
 Inside Outside Magazine Interview
 Outside magazine story
 Ultimate Survival Alaska, Season 3

Living people
Sportspeople from Utah
1970 births